Shannon Kleibrink (born October 7, 1968 in Norquay, Saskatchewan) is a retired Canadian curler from Okotoks, Alberta. She and her team of third Amy Nixon, second Glenys Bakker, lead Christine Keshen and alternate Sandra Jenkins represented Canada at the 2006 Winter Olympics in Turin, Italy. They won a bronze medal.

Career
As a junior curler, Kleibrink lost in the final of the 1987 junior provincial championships, and in the Alberta final to qualify for the Canada Winter Games, both to LaDawn Funk.

After losing in the final of the 1991 Alberta Scott Tournament of Hearts, Kleibrink won the 1993 provincial title, defeating Funk in the final. This qualified her to represent Alberta at the 1993 Scott Tournament of Hearts, Canada's national curling championship. There, her team of Sandra Jenkins, Sally Shigehiro and Joanne Wright finished 6-5. Kleibrink didn't qualify for the Scotts again until 2004, but in the meantime she made it to the final of the 1997 Olympic Trials. At the trials, where the winner played for Canada at the 1998 Winter Olympics, Kleibrink lost in the final to Sandra Schmirler. In 2004 Kleibrink became the first woman to win a Canadian Mixed Curling Championship as skip. She was also the first woman to skip a team at the mixed, when she did so the previous year, where she lost in the final. Only a few weeks later, Kleibrink and her women's team won the 2004 Alberta Scott Tournament of Hearts, defeating the defending champion Deb Santos team in the final, 6–5.  At the 2004 Scott Tournament of Hearts, Kleibrink and her team of Amy Nixon, Glenys Bakker and Stephanie Marchand finished 6–5, out of the playoffs.

In 2005, Kleibrink won that year's Canada Cup where she beat Jan Betker in the final. Later on that year, Kleibrink qualified for the Olympics, when they beat Kelly Scott's team from Kelowna, British Columbia at the 2005 Canadian Olympic trials. Kleibrink's team began the tournament at 1-3 before winning seven straight games to qualify. In the final end of the championship game, Kleibrink scored 3 points to win the match 8–7.

Kleibrink won the 2008 Alberta Scotties Tournament of Hearts, by defeating Renée Sonnenberg in the final, coming back from a 5–1 deficit to win 7–6.  This qualified her team to represent Alberta at the 2008 Scotties Tournament of Hearts in Regina, Saskatchewan, where she represented Alberta for a third time. There, she had her best career showing at the Hearts. They finished in first place after the round robin with a 10–1 record. They then defeated Sherry Middaugh of Ontario to advance to the finals for the first time. However, she was defeated in the championship game by Jennifer Jones of Manitoba.

The following year, Kleibrink's team lost to Heather Nedohin's rink in the 2009 Alberta Scotties Tournament of Hearts semi-final, failing to return to that year's national championships. However, Kleibrink did see some success, having won the 2009 Canada Cup of Curling, defeating Marie-France Larouche in the final. In addition, Kleibrink earned a direct berth into the 2009 Canadian Olympic Curling Trials to be held in Edmonton. At the Olympic Trials, Kleibrink lost in the final to Cheryl Bernard. Kleibrink failed to make it to the Scotties once again, losing to Valerie Sweeting in the 2010 Alberta Scotties Tournament of Hearts final.

It was announced at the 2011 Canada Cup of Curling, that following the event, Bronwen Webster, who is pregnant, will sit out the rest of the season and be replaced by Carolyn McRorie, who had filled in for Kleibrink earlier in the season, and Matson, who did not participate in the Canada Cup for family obligations.

For the 2012/2013 season, Kleibrink will add Kalynn Park to her lineup at second position. Kleibrink's longtime third Amy Nixon decided to leave and form her own rink. Bronwen Webster will move up to play third and Chelsey Matson will remain at lead. Park joined the team at the end of the 2011/2012 season, playing in one tournament, the 2012 Victoria Curling Classic Invitational, at the third position.

For the 2015/2016 season, Kleibrink has added Sarah Wilkes and Alison Kotylak to her team.

After the 2017-18 Season Kleibrink announced her retirement

Personal life
Kleibrink works as the Director of Community Curling Centre Development for Curling Alberta. She is married to Richard Kleibrink and has two children. She currently coaches the Kayla Skrlik rink, and formerly coached her son, Kyler.

Grand Slam record

Former events

References

External links
 

1968 births
Living people
Curlers from Calgary
Curlers at the 2006 Winter Olympics
Canadian women curlers
Canadian mixed curling champions
Olympic curlers of Canada
Olympic bronze medalists for Canada
Olympic medalists in curling
Medalists at the 2006 Winter Olympics
Curlers from Saskatchewan
Continental Cup of Curling participants
Canada Cup (curling) participants
Canadian curling coaches